IBM Big Blue may refer to:

 IBM Big Blue (rugby union), a rugby union team in Japan
 IBM Big Blue (X-League), an American football team in Japan

See also
 IBM (nicknamed "Big Blue"), the American technology company that founded the above teams